Álvaro Carrillo Alarcón (2 December 1921 - 3 April 1969) was a Mexican popular music composer and songwriter, born in San Juan Cacahuatepec, Oaxaca. He wrote over 300 songs, mostly boleros, including the great hits Amor mío, Sabor a mí, Como se lleva un lunar, El andariego, Luz de luna, Sabrá Dios, Seguiré mi viaje and La mentira.

Early life and education
Álvaro Carrillo Alarcón was born in 1921 to a father of Spanish European descent and a mother of both Indigenous Mixtec and African descent. He came from a very humble family as they lived in extreme poverty. His father owned three cows which he believed made him a "rich" man and at that time it did, just to get an idea of the picture. Since his father was a country man who came from a long line of farmers he was eagerly set on keeping all his sons stuck to his family's business on the field. A very young Alvaro was not interested in obeying his father at all and would hide, instead of doing his farm chores he'd  spend his time reading poetry being fascinated by Greek mythology from an early age aswell. After the tragic death of his mother (while he was only 8) he grew up with another woman as his mother. By age 12/13 he had discovered an interest in the guitar and as he grew so did his musical ear always being introduced to new sounds and many types of music while growing up in San Juan Cacahuatepec, Oaxaca.
In 1940, Carrillo enrolled in the National Agricultural School in Chapingo, where he composed his first songs as a student. In 1945, he graduated in Agricultural Engineering.

Career
Carrillo worked in the Corn Commission, but left engineering to become a composer. He became a friend of singer Antonio Pérez Mesa of the Trío Los Duendes. He wrote the song "Amor," for the trio; it rapidly became popular. Carrillo was a prolific composer, writing more than 300 songs during his life; many were boleros, a Mexican-style rhythmic ballad. His career was ended abruptly when he died in a car accident on 3 April 1969. His songs have continued to be covered by Mexican and international artists in the decades since his death.

Mexican romantic pop, ballad and bolero singer Luis Miguel recorded Carrillo's bolero "La Mentira" (The Lie) in Miguel's platinum album, Romance (1990), released by WEA. He later included Carrillo's song "Sabor a mí" in another of his hit platinum albums, Romances (1997), also by WEA.

Mexican musicians and singers know many of the songs from the Álvaro Carrillo songbook by heart. Noted interpreters of his songs include: Javier Solis, Pepe Jara, Trio Los Santos, and Linda Arce.

Representation in popular culture
Álvaro Carrillo's life inspired the film Sabor a mí (1988), directed by René Cardona, in which Carrillo was portrayed by Mexican singer José José.

References

External links

1921 births
1969 deaths
Mexican male composers
People from Oaxaca
Singers from Oaxaca
20th-century composers
Latin music songwriters
20th-century Mexican male singers
Road incident deaths in Mexico